Masafi Al-Junoob Sport Club, is an Iraqi football team based in Al-Shaibah, Basra, that plays in Iraq Division one.

History

in Premier League
Masafi Al-Junoob played in the Iraqi Premier League in 2009–10 season, but relegated to the Iraq Division One after finished the season in 18th place in the Group Stage.

Managerial history

  Asaad Abdul-Razzaq
  Nasser Talla Dahilan
  Abdul-Yemma Warwar

See also 
 2021–22 Iraq FA Cup
 2022–23 Iraq FA Cup

Other games

Beach soccer  
Masafi Al-Junoob beach soccer team won the 2016–17 Iraqi Beach Soccer League title, and transferred trophy of the championship to Basra for the first time.

References

External links
 Masafi Al-Junoob SC on Goalzz.com
 Iraq Clubs- Foundation Dates

Football clubs in Iraq
2005 establishments in Iraq
Association football clubs established in 2005
Football clubs in Basra
Basra